The 2012 Adelaide Thunderbirds season saw Adelaide Thunderbirds compete in the 2012 ANZ Championship. After winning nine games doing the regular season, Thunderbirds finished fourth and qualified for the play-offs. However they subsequently lost the minor semi-final 49–48 to the eventual overall champions, Waikato Bay of Plenty Magic.

Players

Jhaniele Fowler
In November 2011, Thunderbirds signed Jhaniele Fowler, the Jamaica international. However the deal depended upon Carla Borrego, a former Jamaica international, successfully becoming an Australian citizen and thus freeing up Thunderbirds' export place for Fowler. This did not happen in time for the start of the season and the deal collapsed.

Player movements

2012 roster

Notes
  Cody Lange, Maddy Proud, Melissa Rowland and Kate Shimmin  were all members of the 2012 Southern Force squad. With a team that was coached by Tania Obst and also featured other past and future Thunderbirds' players Kelly Altmann, Georgia Beaton and Sheree Wingard, Southern Force finished as 2012 Australian Netball League champions, defeating NNSW Waratahs 50–36 in the grand final.
  Amehlia Schmidt was also in the 2012 Australian Institute of Sport ANL squad.

Tauranga Pre-Season Tournament
On 2, 3 and 4 March, Waikato Bay of Plenty Magic hosted a pre-season tournament at the TECT Arena in Tauranga. For the first time since 2008, all ten ANZ Championship teams competed at the same tournament. The ten teams were divided into two pools of five. Teams within each pool played each other once and the winners qualified for the final. Thunderbirds finished the tournament in 7th place.   

7th/8th place play-off

Regular season

Fixtures and results
Round 1

Round 2

Round 3

Round 4

Round 5

Round 6

Round 7

Round 8

Round 9
Adelaide Thunderbirds received a bye.
Round 10

Round 11

Round 12

Round 13

Round 14

Final table

Finals

Minor semi-final

Award winners

Thunderbirds awards

References

Adelaide Thunderbirds seasons
Adelaide Thunderbirds